Superia (Dr. Deidre Wentworth) is a supervillain and criminal scientist appearing in American comic books published by Marvel Comics.

Publication history
She first appeared in Captain America #387 (1991) and was created by writer Mark Gruenwald and artist Rik Levins.

Superia first appeared as leader of the Femizons, a team of supervillains seeking female world domination.

Fictional character biography
Little is known of the past of the woman known as Superia, but she was first seen where she and a small army of female supervillains plotted to sterilize all other women in the world, making their reproductive capabilities valuable beyond measure. She was initially inspired to use her scientific knowledge to conquer the world when she discovered, via use of a "time probe", that a descendant of hers, Thundra, would rule the world-spanning matriarchy of the "Femizons". Her plan was thwarted by Captain America and his allies (Paladin, Diamondback, Asp and Black Mamba).

She later appeared alongside a much smaller group of Femizons, consisting of Blackbird, Iron Maiden, Nightshade and Snapdragon. This group fought against the criminal scientists of AIM, and were defeated, thanks in part to former Femizon M.O.D.A.M. Superia was saved from certain death by Captain America.

Superia again appeared as "Dr. Deidre Wentworth", and gave a young woman named Cathy Webster superhuman physical traits and subliminal performance-boosting messages. These messages also bound Webster (now called Free Spirit) to Superia's control, though Webster was quickly freed. After a failed negotiation with the Baroness Zemo, she convinced Diamondback to join her as penance for having killed her former lieutenant Snapdragon.

Superia and Diamondback resurfaced soon after, when Superia was convinced to give Captain America a treatment and cure to reverse a paralytic effect resulting from the serum that had given him his powers. The three of them, alongside other allies of Captain America, attacked AIM to steal its new Cosmic Cube, but were forced to retreat. It was at that time the cure was stolen by the Red Skull, whose mind was at the time living in a body cloned from Captain America, who used the cure on himself, and shot and apparently killed Superia.

Having acquired the power of the Cube - although unable to control it directly - Superia sent her knowledge back in time to her younger self, where she was able to use her knowledge to infiltrate A.I.M., create a new heroic identity for herself and some chosen allies, and subsequently infiltrate the Avengers by removing Captain America from history after his 'death' in the Second World War, essentially supplanting his post-war role. With her new position, she allowed the Avengers to disband and be replaced by her 'Americommandos', who arrested the X-Men and other mutants, captured 'illegal' superhumans like Luke Cage and Spider-Man, and arranged for the Fantastic Four to be lost in the Negative Zone, forcing Henry Pym, the Invisible Woman, and the Wasp into retirement, and 'killing' Tony Stark while he was undergoing heart surgery while keeping his brain alive to use his intellect. Tath Ki, the Contemplator, learned of her actions, and was able to recruit a 'resistance movement' of time-displaced heirs to Captain America's legacy, including Steve Rogers early in his career, the U.S. Agent shortly after his own time as Captain America, American Dream, Commander A from the twenty-fifth century, and the present-day Bucky to oppose her. Having learned of Superia's plans, Steve Rogers merged with one of his later selves when the team was sucked into the Cosmic Cube and arrived at the reality nexus where the removed Captain Americas had been sent, the merger creating a chronal ripple that undid her actions.

Superia reappeared years later as the leader of H.A.M.M.E.R. She took the leadership role after Norman Osborn, former leader of H.A.M.M.E.R., was taken into custody. The New Avengers captured her after getting a tip from Victoria Hand. When Osborn escaped from the Raft, he broke Superia out also. She immediately joined Norman Osborn's second incarnation of the Dark Avengers as the new Ms. Marvel. Superia and the other members of the Dark Avengers were defeated by both Avengers teams when it turned out that her teammate Skaar was the Avengers' double-agent.

Superia later appears on the High Council of A.I.M. (consisting of Andrew Forson, Graviton, Jude the Entropic Man, Mentallo, Yelena Belova, and the double agent Taskmaster) as the Minister of Education in Bagalia, a country run and populated by supervillains. She is badly injured after an incident on A.I.M. Island regarding an escaped creature. She then made plans to retrieve the creature for the Scientist Supreme.

Powers and abilities
In addition to her natural scientific genius and status as a polymath, Superia possesses several superhuman powers that she apparently gave to herself via genetic alterations. She possesses a large amount of superhuman strength, which allowed her to knock a large jet out of the air with ease, match Ms. Marvel in hand-to-hand combat, and bloody Skaar's mouth with a single punch. Superia also possesses an enhanced resistance to damage, which allowed her to take repeated punches from Ms. Marvel, Skaar, and Luke Cage without harm, and is able to fly, with an unknown top speed. Finally, Superia has also shown the ability to generate powerful, green concussive energy blasts from her fists. By concentrating the power of her energy blasts, Superia was able to create a massive explosion that allowed her to escape from the New Avengers. Even without her powers, Superia has claimed to possess knowledge of martial arts.

References

External links
 Superia at Marvel Wiki

Comics characters introduced in 1991
Fictional professors
Fictional female scientists
Marvel Comics characters with superhuman strength
Marvel Comics martial artists
Marvel Comics mutates
Characters created by Mark Gruenwald
Sterilization in fiction
Marvel Comics female supervillains